The spectacled thrush, bare-eyed thrush, or yellow-eyed thrush (Turdus nudigenis), is a resident breeding bird in the  Lesser Antilles and in South America from Colombia and  Venezuela south and east to northern Brazil. In Trinidad and Tobago, this thrush is also known as big-eye grieve.

The similar but allopatric Ecuadorian thrush was formerly considered a subspecies of the bare-eyed thrush and named T. n. maculirostris; it is now normally considered as a separate species T. maculirostris. It has a narrower eyering and is only found in forest and woodland in western Ecuador and northwestern Peru.

Description
It is plain olive-brown above and paler brown below. The throat is brown-streaked off-white, and the lower belly is whitish. It has a prominent yellow eye ring which gives rise to its English and scientific names.

There are two poorly defined subspecies, differing mainly in the darkness of the plumage. Sexes are similar, but young birds are flecked above and spotted below, and have a thinner eye ring.

Ecology
The habitat of this large thrush is open woodland, forest clearings and cultivation. The bare-eyed thrush mainly feeds on or near the ground on fruit, berries and some insects and earthworms. It is a shy species, but on Trinidad and Tobago it is much tamer, and will come to feeders and take food from tables.

The nest is a lined bulky cup of twigs low in a tree. The two to three reddish-blotched deep-blue eggs are incubated by the female alone.

References

 Clement, Peter & Hathaway, Ren (2000): Thrushes. Christopher Helm, London. 
 ffrench, Richard; O'Neill, John Patton & Eckelberry, Don R. (1991): A guide to the birds of Trinidad and Tobago (2nd edition). Comstock Publishing, Ithaca, N.Y. 
 Hilty, Steven L. (2003): Birds of Venezuela. Christopher Helm, London. 

spectacled thrush
Birds of Colombia
Birds of Venezuela
Birds of the Guianas
Birds of the Lesser Antilles
Birds of Grenada
Birds of Martinique
Birds of Saint Lucia
Birds of Saint Vincent and the Grenadines
Birds of Trinidad and Tobago
Birds of Brazil
spectacled thrush
Birds of the Amazon Basin